

Chad articles

Chad-related people

Ibrahim Abatcha
Abdullah I (Kanem-Bornu king)
Abdelwahit About
Ahmad (Kanem-Bornu king)
Ahmat Acyl
Mahamat Ali Adoum
Aissa Kili N'guirmamaramama
Ali Gazi
Ali II of Bornu
Ahmad Allam-Mi
Michel Arnaud
Hissein Atie
Mohamed Baghlani
Antoine Bangui
Jean Alingué Bawoyeu
Misdongard Betoligar
Djamal Mahamat Bindi
Biri I
Toupta Boguena
Outel Bono
Solomon Braun
Henri Bretonnet
Michel Brunet (paleontologist)
Françoise Claustre
Issa Serge Coelo
Yves Coppens
Dunama Dabbalemi
Dawud of Kanem
Brahim Déby
Idriss Déby
Hassan Djamous
Youssouf Djaoro
Yaya Dillo Djérou
Koibla Djimasta
Negue Djogo
Jacques Doumro
Dunama I
Dunama IX Lefiami
Eliane Duthoit
Félix Éboué
Timane Erdimi
Moussa Faki
Jacques Foccart
Pierre Toura Gaba
Pierre Galopin
Émile Gentil
Camille Gourvenec
Hissène Habré
Mahamat Saleh Haroun
Mahamat Hissein
Mahamat Hissene
Hummay
Mahamat Idriss
Idris I (Kanem-Bornu king)
Robert Jaulin
Paul Joalland
Ibn Furtu
Ibni Oumar Mahamat Saleh
Ibrahim IV of Bornu
Haroun Kabadi
Kachim Biri
Wadel Abdelkader Kamougué
Saleh Kebzabo
Djibrine Kerallah
Oueddei Kichidemi
Delwa Kassiré Koumakoye
Alphonse Kotiga
Abbas Koty
Ahmed Koulamallah
Brahim Koulamallah
Laotegguelnodji Koumtog
Marie-Christine Koundja
Kuri I of Kanem
Kuri II of Kanem
Koulsy Lamko
Amédée-François Lamy
Gabriel Lisette
Elise Loum
Serge Malé
Hassan Abdallah Mardigue
Félix Malloum
Matthias N'Gartéri Mayadi
Octave Meynier
Ngarindo Milengar
Idriss Miskine
Djikoloum Mobele
Fidèle Moungar
Idriss Ndele Moussa
Baba Moustapha
Ahmed Hassan Musa
Kaltouma Nadjina
Japhet N'Doram
Maurice Ngangtar
Djidingar Dono Ngardoum
Sam Nolutshungu
Mahamat Nour
Mahamat Nouri
Mohammed I of Kanem
Noël Milarew Odingar
Omar I of Kanem
Othman I
Othman II
Othman III
Nassour Guelendouksia Ouaido
Goukouni Oueddei
Albert Pahimi Padacké
Laurence Pope
Muhammad Hamid Al Qarani
Rabih az-Zubayr
Aboubakar Abdel Rahmane
Gontchomé Sahoulba
Youssouf Saleh Abbas
Mahamat Saleh Annadif
Fatma Samoura
Joseph Brahim Seid
Selma (king)
Ahmed Senoussi
Mbaydoum Simeon
Lol Mohamed Shawa
Abba Siddick
MC Solaar
Daoud Soumain
Christophe Staewen
Ahmat Taboye
Youssouf Togoïmi
Nabatingue Toko
François Tombalbaye
Umar of Borno
Donald Yamamoto
Nagoum Yamassoum
Pascal Yoadimnadji
Joseph Yodoyman
Ngarlejy Yorongar
Adoum Younousmi

Places in Chad

Chad
List of cities in Chad
Abéché
Ade
Adré
Am Dam
Amdjereme
Am Timan
Arada
Ati
Bahaï
Bardaï
Biltine
Bokoro
Bol
Bongor
Borota
Bousso
Doba
Fada
Faya-Largeau
Fianga
Gaoui
Gori
Goz Beïda
Guéréda
Iriba
Kayrati
Kélo
Koro Toro
Koumogo
Koumra
Laï
Linia
Mani
Mao
Massaguet
Massakory
Massenya
Moundou
Mongo
Moussoro
N'Djamena
Mbololo
Ouara
Oum Hadjer
Pala
Sarh
Yao
Zouar
Prefectures of Chad
Batha Prefecture
Biltine Prefecture
Borkou-Ennedi-Tibesti
Chari-Baguirmi Prefecture
Guéra Prefecture
Kanem Prefecture
Lac Prefecture
Logone Occidental Prefecture
Logone Oriental Prefecture
Mayo-Kébbi Prefecture
Moyen-Chari Prefecture
Ouaddaï Prefecture
Salamat Prefecture
Tandjilé Prefecture
Regions of Chad
Batha Region
Bourkou-Ennedi-Tibesti Region
Chari-Baguirmi Region
Guéra Region
Hadjer-Lamis
Kanem Region
Lac Region
Logone Occidental Region
Logone Oriental Region
Mandoul
Mayo-Kebbi Est
Mayo-Kebbi Ouest
Moyen-Chari Region
Ouaddaï Region
Salamat Region
Tandjilé Region
Wadi Fira
Departments of Chad
Aboudeïa
Assoungha
Baguirmi
Barh Azoum
Barh El Gazel
Barh Köh
Barh Sara
Barh Signaka
Batha Est
Batha Ouest
Biltine
Borkou
Chari
Dababa
Dagana
Dar Tama
Djourf Al Ahmar
Dodjé
Ennedi Est
Ennedi Ouest
Fitri
Grande Sido
Guéra
Haraze Al Biar
Haraze Mangueigne
Kabbia
Kanem
Kobé
La Nya Pendé
La Pendé
Lac Iro
Lac Léré
Lac Wey
Lanya
Loug Chari
Mamdi
Mandoul Occidental
Mandoul Oriental
Mayo-Boneye
Mayo-Dallah
Mayo Lemie
Mont Illi
Monts de Lam
Ngourkosso
Ouara
Sila
Tandjilé Est
Tandjilé Ouest
Tibesti
Wayi
Sub-prefectures of Chad
Avenue Charles de Gaulle

Nature in Chad

List of lakes in Chad
Lake Fitri
Lake Chad
Tibesti Soda Lake
Lake Fianga
Lake Yoa
List of volcanoes in Chad
Emi Koussi
Tarso Toh
Toussidé
Tarso Voon
Trou au Natron
Craters of Chad
Aorounga crater
Gweni-Fada crater
List of rivers of Chad
Bahr Salamat
Chari River
Logon River
Mayo Kébbi
Ouham River
Batha River
Bragoto River
List of protected areas in Chad
Bahr Salamat Faunal Reserve
Zakouma National Park
Aouk National Park
Goz Beïda National Park
Manda National Park
Gauthiot Falls
Guelta d'Archei
Bodélé Depression
Borkou
Tibesti Mountains
Ennedi Plateau
Ennedi tiger
List of birds of Chad
Wildlife of Chad
Aloba Arch
List of mammals in Chad
Biomphalaria tchadiensis
Reichenow's firefinch
Heuglin's wheatear
Vulpes riffautae
List of ecoregions in Chad
South Saharan steppe and woodlands
Sahel
Sahara
Sudan (region)
Tibesti-Jebel Uweinat montane xeric woodlands
Sudanian Savanna

Ethnic groups in Chad

Anakaza
Andang
Baggara
Beni Halba
Bidayat
Bilala
Buduma
Daza
Am Dam
Fongoro
Fur
Haddad
Hadjarai
Hausa
Hawazma
Kanembu
Kanuri people
Kim
Kimr
Lisi
Maba
Mararit
Masalit
Musgum
Sara
Shuweihat
Sinyar
Sungor
Tama
Teda
Toubou
Tunjur
Tupuri
Yerwa Kanuri
Zaghawa people

Languages of Chad

Linguistic groupings
List of Chadic languages
List of "A" East Chadic languages
Adamawa languages
Biu–Mandara languages
Biu–Mandara B languages
Biu–Mandara B.1 languages
Bua languages
Chadic languages
Daju languages
East Chadic languages
East Chadic A languages
East Chadic A.1 languages
East Chadic A.1.2 languages
East Chadic B languages
East Chadic B.1 languages
East Chadic B.1.1 languages
East Chadic B.1.2 languages
East Chadic B.3 languages
Fur languages
Gula language
Kim languages
Kotoko languages
Maban languages
Masa languages
Mbum languages
Mbum–Day languages
Mimi language
Saharan languages
Sara languages
Taman languages
Tebu languages
Ubangian languages

Languages
Amdang language
Baguirmi language
Barein language
Bidiyo language
Birgit language
Bolgo language
Boor language
Bua language
Buduma language
Buso language
Chadian Arabic
Dangaléat language
Day language
Dazaga language
Fula language
Gadang language
Gula Iro language
Jonkor Bourmataguil language
Kajakse language
Kanuri language
Kera language
Kujargé language
Laal
Lagwan language
Mabire language
Malgbe language
Mararit language
Marba language
Masalit language
Maslam language
Masmaje language
Massa language
Mawa language (Chad)
Migaama language
Miltu language
Mogum language
Mokilko language
Mpade language
Mser language
Mubi language
Naba language
Niellim language
Saba language
Sarua language
Sokoro language
Sungor language
Tama language
Tamki language
Tedaga language
Toram language
Tupuri language
Ubi language
Zaghawa language
Zirenkel language

History of Chad

African Democratic Rally
Central Emergency Response Fund
War in Chad (2005-present)
Mediation of the Chadian-Sudanese conflict
Second Battle of Adré
Borota raid
Amdjereme raid
Battles of N'Djamena
Chadian Armed Forces
Chadian National Armed Forces
Heads of state of Chad
Heads of government of Chad
Colonial heads of Chad
Prime Minister of Chad
Chadian coup of 1975
Colonial Chad
The Tombalbaye Regime
Malloum's military government
Transitional Government of National Unity
Kanem Empire
Bornu Empire
Kingdom of Baguirmi
Ouaddai Empire
Kano Accord
Lagos Accord
Tripoli Agreement
Authenticité
Battle of Kousséri
Njimi
Postage stamps and postal history of Chad
Rulers of Baguirmi
Rulers of the Ouaddai Kingdom
Sao civilisation
Sayfawa dynasty
Mangalmé riots
Cotton Price Stabilization Board
2006 Chadian coup d'état attempt
Operation Epervier
Ouadi Doum air raid
Dalola raid
Battle of Fada
2004 Chadian coup d'état attempt
Australopithecus bahrelghazali
Sahelanthropus tchadensis
Abel (hominid)
Operation Bison
Dakar accord
Aouzou Strip
Dar Sila
Battle of Togbao
April 8 Humanitarian Ceasefire Agreement
Battle of Kouno
Voulet-Chanoine Mission
2006 Zakouma elephant slaughter
Islamic Legion
Toyota War
Operation Manta
Girgam
Air West Flight 612
Sahel drought
Derde
United Nations Security Council Resolution 151
UTA Flight 772
African Socialist Movement
Wadai War
Trans-Saharan Counterterrorism Initiative
Second Tuareg Rebellion
Pan Sahel Initiative
2007 in Chad
2007 African floods
United Nations Mission in the Central African Republic and Chad
Operation Mount Hope III
Battle of Kufra (1941)
EUFOR Tchad/RCA
History of the military of Chad
2008 Kousseri vaccination campaign
Battle of N'Djamena (2008)
2007 Zoé's Ark controversy
2008 attack on Omdurman and Khartoum
CIA activities in Chad
Agisymba
2008 in Chad
Customs and Economic Union of Central Africa
Battle of Am Zoer

Chadian elections

Chadian presidential election, 2006
Chadian presidential election, 2001
Chadian presidential election, 1996
Chadian constitutional referendum, 2005
Chadian parliamentary election, 2007
Chadian parliamentary election, 2002
Chadian parliamentary election, 1997
Chadian constitutional referendum, 1996

Chadian political parties

Patriotic Salvation Movement
Rally for Democracy and Progress (Chad)
Front of Action Forces for the Republic
National Rally for Development and Progress
National Union for Democracy and Renewal
Union for Renewal and Democracy
Action for Unity and Socialism
Action for Renewal of Chad
People's Movement for Democracy in Chad
National Democratic and Federal Convention
National Democratic and Social Convention
Rally for the Republic - Lingui
National Rally for Democracy in Chad
National Union (Chad)
Rally of Democratic Forces in Chad
Chadian Democratic Union
Chadian National Union
Chadian Progressive Party
Chadian Social Action
National Movement for the Cultural and Social Revolution
Union for Democracy and Republic (Chad)
Party for Liberty and Development
Renewed African Socialist Movement
National Union for Independence and Revolution

Rebel militia groups
FROLINAT
Armed Forces of the North
People's Armed Forces
Western Armed Forces
Codos
Popular Movement for the Liberation of Chad
Popular Front for the Liberation of Chad
Command Council of the Armed Forces of the North
Chadian People's Revolutionary Movement
Movement for Democracy and Justice in Chad
Platform for Change, Unity and Democracy
Rally for Democracy and Liberty
United Front for Democratic Change
Liberation Front of Chad
Democratic Front of Chad
Volcan Army
Rally of Democratic Forces (rebel group)
Union of Forces for Democracy
Union of Forces for Democracy and Development-Fundamental

Government of Chad
Government of Chad
National Assembly of Chad
Foreign relations of Chad
Colonial heads of French Equatorial Africa
La Tchadienne
Flag of Chad
Coat of arms of Chad
Petroleum Revenue Oversight and Control Committee
Prime Minister of Chad
Military of Chad
Chad Air Force
Nomad and National Guard
Constitutional Council of Chad
Law enforcement in Chad
Supreme Court of Chad
Constitution of Chad
List of diplomatic missions in Chad
Diplomatic missions of Chad
Chad-France relations
Chad-Libya relations
Chad-Nigeria relations
Chad-Sudan relations
Chad-United States relations
Education in Chad

Culture of Chad

Chad at the Olympics
Chad at the 1964 Summer Olympics
Chad at the 1968 Summer Olympics
Chad at the 1972 Summer Olympics
Chad at the 1984 Summer Olympics
Chad at the 1988 Summer Olympics
Chad at the 1992 Summer Olympics
Chad at the 1996 Summer Olympics
Chad at the 2000 Summer Olympics
Chad at the 2004 Summer Olympics
Chad Cultural Centre
Chad national football team
Chad National Museum
Chadian cuisine
Chadian Football Federation
Chari Jazz
Daratt
Holidays in Chad
H'Sao
List of Chadian films
Music of Chad
Stade Nacional (Chad)
Kakaki
Kaskara
Saharan rock art
UDEAC Championship
CEMAC Cup
UNIFAC Cup
Chad Premier League
Chad Cup
Unifac Clubs Cup
Sport in Chad
Bye Bye Africa
Literature of Chad
DJA FM
DP75: Tartina City
Daresalam
Chad national rugby union team
CAR Castel Beer Trophy
Archdiocese of N'Djamena
Diocese of Doba
Diocese of Goré
Diocese of Lai
Roman Catholic Diocese of Moundou
Roman Catholic Diocese of Pala
Roman Catholic Diocese of Sarh
Association of Baptist Churches of Chad
Islam in Chad
Roman Catholicism in Chad

Economy of Chad

Agriculture in Chad
Banque Sahélo-Saharienne pour l'Investissement et le Commerce
Bank of Central African States
CFA franc
Chad-Cameroon Petroleum Development and Pipeline Project
Cotontchad
Ecobank
Economic and Monetary Community of Central Africa
Economic Community of Central African States
Fishing in Chad
Forestry in Chad
Free Confederation of Chadian Workers
Manufacturing in Chad
Mining in Chad
Organization for Community Supported Sustainable Agriculture in Chad
Union of Trade Unions of Chad
Utilities in Chad
Tourism in Chad

Infrastructures of Chad
Air Afrique
Air Afrique Horizon
Abéché Airport
Celtel
Communications in Chad
List of airports in Chad
Moundou Airport
Ndjamena-Djibouti Highway
N'Djamena International Airport
Sarh Airport
SotelTchad
Toumai Air Chad
.td
Transport in Chad
Tripoli-Cape Town Highway

Other Chad-related articles
Fédération du Scoutisme Tchadien
Association des Guides du Tchad
Gay rights in Chad
American International School of N'Djamena
University of N'Djamena
Demographics of Chad
Association Tchadienne pour la Promotion et la Défense des Droits de l'Homme
Scouting in Chad
Human rights in Chad
Kabka Sultanate
Permanent Interstate Committee for drought control in the Sahel
Office for the Coordination of Humanitarian Affairs
African Petroleum Producers Association
Community of Sahel-Saharan States
Economic and Monetary Community of Central Africa
Customs and Economic Union of Central Africa
Economic Community of Central African States
Bank of Central African States
Zoé's Ark
Food security in Chad

Chad templates
Template:Politics of Chad
Template:Political Affiliations: Chad
Template:History of Chad
Template:Chad-bio-stub
Template:Chad-politician-stub
Template:Chad-geo-stub
Template:Chad-footy-bio-stub
Template:Chad-stub
Template:Regions of Chad
Template:Departments of Chad
Template:Prefectures of Chad
Template:WikiProject Chad
Template:Chadian elections
Template:Campaignbox Chad-Libya
Template:Second Chadian Civil War

Chad-related categories
:Category:Chad
:Category:Buildings and structures in Chad
:Category:Communications in Chad
:Category:Chadian culture
:Category:Museums in Chad
:Category:Chadian music
:Category:Chadian musical groups
:Category:Ethnic groups in Chad
:Category:Baggara tribes
:Category:Hausa
:Category:Languages of Chad
:Category:Religion in Chad
:Category:Christianity in Chad
:Category:Roman Catholic dioceses in Chad
:Category:National symbols of Chad
:Category:Sport in Chad
:Category:Football in Chad
:Category:Football venues in Chad
:Category:Football competitions in Chad
:Category:Chad at the Olympics
:Category:Economy of Chad
:Category:Trade unions in Chad
:Category:Companies of Chad
:Category:Companies of Chad by industry
:Category:Banks of Chad
:Category:Energy in Chad
:Category:Petroleum in Chad
:Category:Tourism in Chad
:Category:Tourist attractions in Chad
:Category:Parks in Chad
:Category:National parks of Chad
:Category:Education in Chad
:Category:Schools in Chad
:Category:Universities and colleges in Chad
:Category:Environment of Chad
:Category:Nature conservation in Chad
:Category:Biota of Chad
:Category:Geography of Chad
:Category:Grasslands of Chad
:Category:Sahel
:Category:Populated places in Chad
:Category:N'Djamena
:Category:Landforms of Chad
:Category:Lakes of Chad
:Category:Mountains of Chad
:Category:Wetlands of Chad
:Category:Ramsar sites in Chad
:Category:Rivers of Chad
:Category:Volcanoes of Chad
:Category:Impact craters of Chad
:Category:Departments of Chad
:Category:Chad geography stubs
:Category:Subdivisions of Chad
:Category:Regions of Chad
:Category:Mandoul Region
:Category:Batha Region
:Category:Chari-Baguirmi Region
:Category:Kanem Region
:Category:Prefectures of Chad
:Category:Government of Chad
:Category:Foreign relations of Chad
:Category:History of Chad
:Category:Central African Republic Bush War
:Category:Darfur conflict
:Category:Second Chadian Civil War
:Category:Battles of the Second Chadian Civil War
:Category:Chadian-Libyan conflict
:Category:Battles of the Chadian-Libyan conflict
:Category:Years in Chad
:Category:2006 in Chad
:Category:2007 in Chad
:Category:Law of Chad
:Category:Military of Chad
:Category:Chadian people
:Category:Chadian people by occupation
:Category:Chadian politicians
:Category:Members of the Pan-African Parliament from Chad
:Category:Kings of Chad
:Category:Chadian writers
:Category:Chadian dramatists and playwrights
:Category:Chadian military personnel
:Category:Chadian diplomats
:Category:Chadian educators
:Category:Chadian academics
:Category:Chadian film directors
:Category:Chadian rebels
:Category:Chadian military leaders
:Category:Chadian sportspeople
:Category:Chadian footballers
:Category:Chadian athletes
:Category:Olympic competitors for Chad
:Category:Olympic athletes of Chad
:Category:Chadian extrajudicial prisoners of the United States
:Category:Politics of Chad
:Category:Elections in Chad
:Category:Political parties in Chad
:Category:Terrorism in Chad
:Category:Society of Chad
:Category:Organisations based in Chad
:Category:Scouting and Guiding in Chad
:Category:Transport in Chad
:Category:Aviation in Chad
:Category:Aviation accidents and incidents in Chad
:Category:Airlines of Chad
:Category:Defunct airlines of Chad
:Category:Airports in Chad
:Category:Chad stubs
:Category:Chad-related lists

See also

 Outline of Chad

 
Chad